The Army of the United States is one of the four major service components of the United States Army (the others being the Regular Army, the United States Army Reserve and the Army National Guard of the United States), but it has been inactive since the suspension of the draft in 1973 and the U.S. military's transition to a volunteer force. Personnel serving in the United States Army during a major national emergency or armed conflict (either voluntarily or involuntarily) were enlisted into the Army of the United States without specifying service in a component. It also includes the "Retired Reserve." Those are retired soldiers who have reached the required years of creditable service, or creditable service and age; regardless of the component, or components they formerly served in.

The term "Army of the United States" or "Armies of the United States" is also the legal name of the collective land forces of the United States as prescribed by the United States Constitution.  In this concept, the term "Army of the United States" has been in use since at least 1841 as in the title General Regulations for the Army of the United States. Also included by Act of the 39th Congress (1866) were the U.S. Volunteers, persons holding a brevetted rank, and the U.S. Veteran Reserve Corps.

History

World War I
The original concept of a non-Regular Army component, existing to augment the standing military, can trace its origins to the United States Volunteers. State volunteer forces were used extensively to augment the Regular Army throughout the 19th and early 20th century.  During World War I and dictated by the provisions of the National Defense Act of 1916, states contributed men to the "Volunteer Army" (more commonly known as the National Army).  During World War I, a standard practice developed for Regular Army officers to serve in higher positions within the National Army, and thus hold two ranks - a permanent rank and a temporary rank.  This concept was related to the idea of the brevet rank, which had generally fallen into disuse by the time of the First World War. The National Army was suspended after World War I.

World War II
In September 1940, the United States reintroduced conscription in response to the increasing likelihood of entry into World War II. Personnel voluntarily enlisting into the United States Army could choose to voluntarily enlist into the Regular Army, National Guard of the United States, or Organized Reserve. On 14 May 1940, legislation provided that all voluntary enlistments in the United States Army during a time of national emergency or war were to be in the Army of the United States "without specification of any particular component or unit thereof." The "Army of the United States" as a service component was formally activated in February 1941. It was legally considered the successor to the National Army.

The Army of the United States saw a major expansion following the 7 December 1941 attack on Pearl Harbor. On 13 December 1941, legislation provided that personnel inducted into the United States Army under the terms of the Selective Training and Service Act of 1940 were, both retroactively and from that date on, considered to be serving in the Army of the United States.

The first commissioned officers serving in the Army of the United States were appointed from the Regular Army. The standard practice was that these officers held a "permanent rank" within the Regular Army as well as a higher "temporary rank" while serving in the Army of the United States. A typical situation might be a colonel in the AUS holding the permanent rank of captain in the Regular Army. Another term for rank held in the Army of the United States was "theater rank."

Promotions within the Army of the United States were sometimes very rapid, and some officers were promoted as many as four to five times in the space of just three to four years. Dwight D. Eisenhower, who served as General of the Army, rose from a colonel to five-star general in three years. However, rank in the AUS could be revoked just as easily, with senior commanders who were relieved reverting to their permanent Regular Army rank. This was known as "loss of theater rank", with some instances of generals returning to the United States in disgrace or at least under a cloud, as only colonels or majors.

Divisions of the Army of the United States

In 1946, with postwar demobilization, the Army of the United States was suspended, along with the draft. Officers from that point reverted to Regular Army rank and all enlisted personnel either were discharged from the Army of the United States and returned to civilian life, or accepted the offer to reenlist in the Regular Army. Units raised in the Army of the United States were deactivated; if the Army chose to activate them again permanently, they were allotted to the Regular Army.

Korean War and Vietnam War

The Army of the United States was demobilized in 1946, but still maintained as a component of the Army.  Upon the outbreak of the Korean War, the Army of the United States consisted of conscripts in the Regular Army, with the National Guard and Army of the United States existing simultaneously in the same theater. The system of prefixes before service numbers was as follows:

ER:         Enlisted Reserve
OR:         Officer Reserve
NG:         National Guard
RA:         Regular Army
US:         Army of the United States

The last use of the Army of the United States (AUS) was during the Vietnam War. It was disbanded in 1974.

Administrative usage

The Army Reserve (USAR) and Army National Guard (ARNG) remained separate components during the modern era of conscription, and their members continued to use their unique identifiers, except in those cases in which officers were appointed or commissioned into a higher grade of rank while on active duty serving in a Regular Army unit. For example, during the war in Vietnam, a graduate of Army ROTC, commissioned as a USAR second lieutenant and serving his initial active duty tour, could be promoted to first lieutenant, or even captain, with a "temporary", active duty (i.e., AUS) commission, while still holding the permanent, USAR rank of second lieutenant. Another example would be an ARNG officer serving on active duty, who might accept a commission in the Regular Army (RA), and then might be promoted one or two grades in the AUS above their RA grade. This possibility could result in situations in which an Army National Guard captain could be called to active duty and accept a commission as a Regular Army major, then be promoted in the AUS, holding a "temporary", active duty commission at a higher rank, and then could retire after 20 or more years of active duty as a lieutenant colonel or colonel, while actually only having met the time-in-grade requirements (and passed the promotion board selection screening process) for the "permanent", Regular Army rank of major.

Service equivalents

There is no equivalent to the Army of the United States in the U.S. Navy, Marine Corps, or Coast Guard.  During World War II, officers who joined one of these branches were typically commissioned into the "Naval Reserve," "Marine Corps Reserve," or "Coast Guard Reserve" respectively (the last of these being newly created in the run up to the war), with the understanding that their active service would be only for the duration of the hostilities. In 1948, for a very brief period, a component known as the "Air Forces of the United States" (AFUS) existed to augment Army Air Forces personnel, who held AUS ranks, into the newly created United States Air Force.

References

United States Army
1941 establishments in the United States